Martí is a Cuban town and municipality in north-eastern section of Matanzas Province.

Geography
The municipality is divided into the barrios of Guamutas, Lacret, La Teja, Martí, Motembo and Río de la Palma. From 1902 until 1927 the village of Máximo Gómez (now part of Perico), was part of Martí.

It is located on the north-central coast of Cuba, and includes the lagoons Inglés, Bibanasí and Majagüillar, all extensions of the Bay of Santa Clara (Bahia de Santa Clara). Its territory is crossed by the rivers La Palma, Júcaro and San Manuel.

History
The town was founded in 1835 was established in 1835 under the name Hato Nuevo on the location of the Bibanosí ranch. On 24 December 1898 the name was changed to Martí, in honour of independence hero José Martí.

Demographics
In 2004, the municipality of Martí had a population of 23,475.

See also
Municipalities of Cuba
List of cities in Cuba

References

External links

Populated places in Matanzas Province
Populated places established in 1835